Mihai Alexa (born 4 August 1974) is a retired Romanian football midfielder.

References

1974 births
Living people
Romanian footballers
FC Politehnica Iași (1945) players
ASC Oțelul Galați players
FC Tiraspol players
FC Zimbru Chișinău players
CSM Focșani players
Association football midfielders
Liga I players
Romanian expatriate footballers
Expatriate footballers in Moldova
Romanian expatriate sportspeople in Moldova